The All-American Canal Bridge is a bridge that carries Interstate 8 over the All-American Canal, a canal that supplies water from the Colorado River to the agricultural areas of the Imperial Valley.

The bridge is located in Imperial County, California, east of El Centro.  The current eastbound was originally built in 1939 as U.S. Route 80; in 1969, the bridge was widened to include freeway shoulders, and the bridge to serve westbound traffic was built as well.

See also 
Alamo Canal
Imperial Irrigation District

References 

Imperial Valley
Lower Colorado River Valley
Transportation buildings and structures in Imperial County, California
Bridges completed in 1939
Bridges completed in 1969
Interstate 8
Road bridges in California
Bridges on the Interstate Highway System
1939 establishments in California